The 1997–98 Football League Cup (known as the Coca-Cola Cup for sponsorship reasons) was the 38th Football League Cup, a knockout competition for England's top 92 football clubs.

The competition began on 11 August 1997, and ended with the final on 29 March 1998, held at Wembley Stadium. The tournament was won by Chelsea, who beat Middlesbrough 2–0 in the final.

First round
The 70 First, Second and Third Division clubs compete from the First Round. Each section is divided equally into a pot of seeded clubs and a pot of unseeded clubs. Clubs' rankings depend upon their finishing position in the 1996–97 season.

1 Team at home in the 1st leg is denoted as the home team

Second round
The 35 winners from the First Round joined the 13 Premier League clubs not participating in European competition and Middlesbrough and Sunderland who were relegated from the Premier League last season. First leg matches were played on 16 and 17 September, second leg matches were played on 23 and 24 September with one match played on 29 September, seven on 30 September and five on 1 October.

1 Team at home in the 1st leg is denoted as the home team

Third round
The 25 winners from the Second Round joined the seven Premiership clubs participating in European competition in Round Three. Matches were played on 14 and 15 October.

Fourth round
Matches were played on 18 and 19 November.

Quarter-finals
The four matches were played on 6 and 7 January.

Semi-finals
The semi-final draw was made in January 1998 after the conclusion of the quarter finals. Unlike the other rounds, the semi-final ties were played over two legs, with each team playing one leg at home. The first leg matches were played on 27 and 28 January 1998, the second leg matches were played on 18 February 1998. Arsenal's hopes of a unique domestic treble were ended by London rivals Chelsea, while Liverpool suffered a surprise exit at the hands of Middlesbrough.

First leg

Second leg

Middlesbrough win 3-2 on aggregate

Chelsea win 4-3 on aggregate

Final

The 1998 Coca-Cola Cup Final was played on 29 March 1998 and was contested between Chelsea and Middlesbrough at Wembley Stadium. Chelsea won the final 2–0 in extra time thanks to goals from Frank Sinclair and Roberto Di Matteo.

External links
Official Carling Cup website
Carling Cup at bbc.co.uk
League Cup news, match reports and pictures on Reuters.co.uk
Results on Soccerbase

1997-98
1997–98 domestic association football cups
Lea
Cup